Refraction, in acoustics, comparable to the refraction of electromagnetic radiation, is the bending of sound propagation trajectories (rays) in inhomogeneous elastic media (gases, liquids, and solids) in which the wave velocity is a function of spatial coordinates. Bending of acoustic rays in layered inhomogeneous media occurs towards a layer with a smaller sound velocity. This effect is responsible for guided propagation of sound waves over long distances in the ocean and in the atmosphere.

In the atmosphere, vertical gradients of wind speed and temperature lead to refraction. The wind speed is usually increasing with height, which leads to a downward bending of the sound rays towards the ground. The same holds if the temperature is increasing with height (inversion). If the temperature is decreasing with height and the wind speed is low, sound rays are bent upwards.

See also
 Atmospheric refraction
 Deep sound channel
 Sound speed gradient
 Underwater acoustics

References

Further reading
 P.M. Morse and K.U. Ingard, Theoretical Acoustics, Princeton University Press, 1986.  

Acoustics